The 2016–17 season of the Cypriot Futsal First Division is the 18th season of top-tier futsal in Cyprus. The regular season started on September 22, 2016, and concluded in April 2017. The championship playoffs will follow the end of the regular season.

APOEL was the defending champions, winning its third title overall and in a row.

Stadia and Locations

Regular season

Standings
</onlyinclude>

Results

Playoffs

Bracket

Quarter-finals

Game 1

Game 2

Game 3

Semi-finals

Game 1

Game 2

Game 3

See also	
 2016–17 Cypriot Futsal Cup

References

Futsal competitions in Cyprus